Vallverdú is a Catalan surname. Notable people with the surname include:

Daniel Vallverdú (born 1986), Venezuelan tennis coach
Josep Vallverdú (born 1923), Spanish writer and poet

Catalan-language surnames